Willamette Valley National Wildlife Refuge Complex is a National Wildlife Refuge complex in the state of Oregon.

Refuges within the complex

References
Complex website

National Wildlife Refuges in Oregon